Azizullah Khan (: born 15 February 1962) is a Pakistani politician hailing from Swat District, who had been a member of the Provincial Assembly of Khyber Pakhtunkhwa from August 2018 till January 2023. He also served as a member of the 10th Provincial Assembly of Khyber Pakhtunkhwa, belonging to the Pakistan Tehreek-e-Insaf.

Political career
Khan was elected as the member of the Khyber Pakhtunkhwa Assembly on ticket of Pakistan Tehreek-e-Insaf from PK-81 Swat-II in 2013 Pakistani general election.

References

1962 births
Living people
Pashtun people
Khyber Pakhtunkhwa MPAs 2013–2018
People from Swat District
Pakistan Tehreek-e-Insaf MPAs (Khyber Pakhtunkhwa)